Ujhani railway station is a small railway station in Budaun district, Uttar Pradesh, Northern India. Its code is UJH. It serves Ujhani city. The station consists of one platform. The platforms are not well sheltered. It lacks many facilities including water and sanitation.

Passing Trains

References

Railway stations in Budaun district
Izzatnagar railway division